"If I Had Eyes" is the first single from Hawaiian singer-songwriter Jack Johnson's album Sleep Through the Static. It was released exclusively on Brushfirerecords.com November 29. The official iTunes single was released on December 11, 2007.

The track features more electric guitar work, similar to that on his On and On album. The track is a mix of acoustic, jazz, and blues. Lyrically, the song expresses the sad breakup of a long-term relationship.

Background and writing
Johnson elaborated to the Herald Sun on how his son Moe (3-years-old at the time this was written) inspired this song: "He was drinking a lot of soya milk at the time. I told him if he kept drinking too much, he would grow a tail with an eyeball at the end. He looked at me trying to make sure I was kidding. When he figured that out, he attached his elbow to his butt and pointed his finger around the room. He had made this tail with an eyeball. He pointed at me and said, 'Dad, you look good.' I thought that was a sweet thing to say."

This inspired Johnson to immediately write If I Had Eyes. Johnson added: "I made a song that said, 'If I had an eyeball on the end of my tail, I'd tell you that you look good as I walked away'. I meant it literally, but once I thought about metaphors (Johnson's friends were divorcing), it was a beautiful way to put it. I switched it around, made it less silly, but kept my son's ideas. I need to give him a songwriting credit."

Music video
The music video for "If I Had Eyes" shows Jack Johnson and his fellow musicians (see below credits) performing the song in a recording studio. The video was shot in grayscale with a few other colors appearing, mostly from the instruments they're playing.

Track listing

CD single
 "If I Had Eyes" - 3:59
 "Let It Be Sung" (with Matt Costa & Zach Gill) - 4:08

Musicians
Jack Johnson - vocals, guitar
Adam Topol - drums
Merlo Podlewski - bass
Zach Gill - piano, clavinet, backup vocals
Danny Riley - backup vocals
JP Plunier - claps, backup vocals
Emmett Malloy - claps
Josh Arroyo - claps

Charts

Certifications

External links
 If I Had Eyes Lyrics
 If I Had Eyes Chords

References

2007 singles
Jack Johnson (musician) songs
Songs written by Jack Johnson (musician)
2007 songs
Universal Music Group singles